Wyant is a surname. Notable people with the surname include:

 Adam Martin Wyant (1869–1935), American politician
 Alexander Helwig Wyant (1836–1892), American landscape painter
 Andy Wyant (1867–1964), American football player
 Emily Kathryn Wyant (1897–1942), American mathematician
 Fred Wyant (1934–2021), American football quarterback
 Gordon Wyant, Canadian lawyer and politician
 James C. Wyant, American optical engineer, entrepreneur, and professor
 Raymond E. Wyant (fl. 1990s–2010s), Chief Judge of the Provincial Court of Manitoba, Canada